Teenage Mutant Ninja Turtles III: Original Motion Picture Soundtrack is the licensed soundtrack to the 1993 New Line Cinema film Teenage Mutant Ninja Turtles III, released by SBK Records on March 9, 1993.

Album information
This collection is considered much weaker than the previous two for its lack of original songs made for the film. It contains the tracks "Tarzan Boy" and "Can't Stop Rockin" which were previously released hit songs, along with the song "Turtle Power" which was a port from the first film's soundtrack, making the album seem to be a rushed project.

Track listing
 Baltimora - "Tarzan Boy"
 ZZ Top - "Can't Stop Rockin'"
 Technotronic featuring Ya Kid K - "Rockin' over the Beat"
 The Barrio Boyzz - "Conga"
 Psychedelic Dust featuring Loose Bruce - "Turtle Jam"
 Definition of Sound - "Fighter"
 John Du Prez and Ocean Music - "Yoshi's Theme"
 Partners in Kryme - "Turtle Power"
 Baltimora - "Tarzan Boy" (Remix)
 Technotronic featuring Ya Kid K - "Rockin' over the Beat" (Rockin' Over Manchester Hacienda Remix)

Notes
 "Tarzan Boy" was previously released on Baltimora's 1985 album Living in the Background.
 At the time of the soundtrack's release, "Tarzan Boy" was being used in a series of commercials for Listerine - it would ultimately be re-issued and reach #51 in a second run on the U.S. Billboard Hot 100.
 "Can't Stop Rockin'" was released eight years prior on ZZ Top's 1985 album Afterburner.
 "Rockin' over the Beat" was previously released on Technotronic's 1990 album Pump Up the Jam: The Album.
 The Barrio Boyzz' cover to Gloria Estefan's "Conga" features a rap written by Frank Nitty.
 "Fighter" was recorded in London three months prior on December 5, 1992.
 "Yoshi's Theme" was the only piece used from the film's score.
 The version of "Turtle Power" is the single version. The version that appears on the soundtrack to the first film is the incomplete version that is featured in the first film's closing credits.

References

III: Original Motion Picture Soundtrack
1993 soundtrack albums
Superhero film soundtracks
Comedy film soundtracks
Teenage Mutant Ninja Turtles (1990 film series)